The Roman Catholic diocese of Lutsk was first established in the 13th century as the diocese of Luceoria (Latin) or Łuck (Polish). After the victory of Napoleon, the diocese was joined with the diocese of Zhytomyr, forming the diocese of Lutzk-Zhitomir-Kamenetz. In 1925, the diocese of Lutsk was restored and the Diocese of Zhytomyr became separate.

Ordinaries

Auxiliary bishops

References

External links
 Official site
 GCatholic.org

Lutsk
Roman Catholic dioceses in Ukraine